The Shire of Beaudesert was a local government area located in South East Queensland, Australia, stretching from the New South Wales border, along the Gold Coast hinterland to the urban fringes of the cities of Brisbane and Ipswich.

History

The Tabragalba Division was incorporated on 11 November 1879 under the Divisional Boards Act 1879 with a population of 869, centred on Beaudesert. 

On 18 January 1884, there was an adjustment of boundaries between subdivision No. 1 of Tabragalba Division and subdivision No.2 of the Coomera Division.

With the passage of the Local Authorities Act 1902, Tabragalba Division became Shire of Tabragalba on 31 March 1903, and on 8 August 1903 was renamed Shire of Beaudesert by an Order in Council.

On 23 November 1912, a separate Town of Beaudesert was established to manage the town itself, but on 14 September 1929 it was merged back into the shire.

Amalgamations in 1948

On 9 December 1948, as part of a major reorganisation of local government in South East Queensland, an Order in Council replacing ten former local government areas between the City of Brisbane and the New South Wales border with only four. The former ten were:
 Beaudesert
 Beenleigh
 Cleveland
 Coolangatta
 Coomera
 Nerang
 Southport
 Tamborine
 Tingalpa
 Waterford

The four resulting local government areas were:
 an enlarged Shire of Beaudesert, an amalgamation of Beaudesert and Tamborine with the western part of Waterford
 the new Shire of Albert: a merger of Beenleigh, Coomera, Nerang (except for the Burleigh Heads area), the southern part of Tingalpa and the eastern part of Waterford
 Town of South Coast, an amalgamation of the Towns of Southport and Coolangatta with the Burleigh Heads part of Nerang (which later became City of Gold Coast)
 the new Redland Shire, an amalgamation of Cleveland and the northern part of Tingalpa (which later became Redland City)
The Order came into effect on 10 June 1949, when the first elections were held.

The enlarged Shire of Beaudesert was split into four divisions with a total of eight councillors—Division 2 with four, Division 4 with two and the others with one each. The chairman (later mayor) was to be chosen from amongst the councillors. The new council was formally established at elections on 31 May 1949 and a Special Meeting was held on 7 June. It had grown 40% in population and gained  in the process.

Growing suburbs

On 8 June 1978, the Shire of Logan was created out of parts of Beaudesert and the Shire of Albert. The council lost  of its area and 11,550 people to Logan. At the 1979 council elections, Beaudesert was resubdivided into eight divisions each electing one councillor.

2008 amalgamations

On 15 March 2008, under the Local Government (Reform Implementation) Act 2007 passed by the Parliament of Queensland on 10 August 2007, the Shire of Beaudesert was abolished and became one of only three Queensland councils, alongside Taroom and Tiaro, to be split in two. The northern area, which while still largely rural was part of Brisbane's growth corridor, became part of Logan City, while the southern rural section became part of the Scenic Rim Region alongside the Shire of Boonah.

Beaudesert became the administrative centre for the Scenic Rim Region and the Beaudesert Shire Council building now houses the Scenic Rim Regional Council. There are 6 Councillors and a Mayor for an area of 4,238sq km and a regional population of 38,000.

Towns and localities

The Shire of Beaudesert included the following settlements:

Northern Beaudesert section:

 Allenview
 Buccan
 Cedar Creek1
 Cedar Grove
 Cedar Vale
 Chambers Flat
 Greenbank2
 Jimboomba
 Kagaru3
 Logan Reserve2
 Logan Village
 Lyons
 Mundoolun

 Munruben
 New Beith
 North Maclean
 Park Ridge South
 South Maclean
 Stockleigh
 Tamborine3
 Undullah3
 Veresdale3
 Veresdale Scrub
 Woodhill
 Yarrabilba

1 - split with the City of Gold Coast
2 - split with Logan City
3 - split with the Scenic Rim Region

Southern Beaudesert section:

 Beaudesert
 Beechmont
 Benobble
 Biddaddaba
 Birnam
 Boyland
 Bromelton
 Canungra
 Christmas Creek
 Cryna
 Gleneagle
 Hillview
 Innisplain
 Josephville

 Kerry
 Kooralbyn
 Lamington
 Lamington National Park
 Laravale
 Palen Creek
 Rathdowney
 Tabooba
 Tabragalba
 Tamborine Mountain
 Tamrookum
 Tamrookum Creek
 Witheren
 Wonglepong

Population

# The estimated 1947 population of the post-1949 area was 8,968.

Chairmen and mayors
The chairmen and mayors of the Beaudesert Division and Shire of Beaudesert were:
 1915-1916 Tom Plunkett
 1927-1929: Joseph Hopkins
 1949–1957: James McDonald Sharp
 1957–1973: Euguene Tilley
 1973–1977: Andrew Drynan
 1977–1979: Eugene Tilley
 1979–1991: Alan Struss
 1991–1997: Michael Fraser
 1997–2000: Joy Drescher
 2000–2004: Ron Munn
 2004–2008: Joy Drescher

The mayors of the Town of Beaudesert (1912—1929) were:
 1916: De Burgh Bannatyne Bentinck Persse
 1917: Stephen Mylett
 1918-29: Montagu Selwyn Smith

See also
 List of tramways in Queensland

References

Further reading
  (59 pages)

External links
 
 

Beaudesert
1879 establishments in Australia
2008 disestablishments in Australia
Populated places disestablished in 2008